Tema West is a constituencies represented in the Parliament of Ghana. It elects one member of parliament by the first past the post system of election. Tema West is located in the Tema Municipal District of the Greater Accra Region of Ghana.

Boundaries 
The constituency is located within the Accra Metropolis District of the Greater Accra Region of Ghana.

Members of parliament

Elections

See also
List of Ghana Parliament constituencies

References 

Parliamentary constituencies in the Greater Accra Region